NK Novalja is a Croatian football club based in the town of Novalja in the north of the island of Pag.

Honours 

 Druga HNL - South:
Winners (1): 2004–05

External links
NK Novalja at Nogometni magazin 

Football clubs in Croatia
Football clubs in Lika-Senj County
Association football clubs established in 1994
1994 establishments in Croatia